Elfenesh Alemu (born 10 June 1975 in Lemo Arya, Arsi Zone) is an Ethiopian long-distance runner, who specializes in the marathon race. She represented Ethiopia at the Summer Olympics in 2000 and 2004. She also competed in the marathon at the World Championships in Athletics four times consecutively from 1997 to 2003.

Alemu began competing in the event in 1993 and won the African Marathon Championships the following year. She took the bronze medal two years later at the 1995 All-Africa Games. She became the first Ethiopian woman to win the Amsterdam Marathon in 1997. She also won the Nagano Olympic Commemorative Marathon in 2000. Her personal best time of 2:24:29 was set in 2001 at the London Marathon, which earned her fifth place in the rankings.

She came third at the 2002 Boston Marathon and won the Tokyo International Women's Marathon in 2003. That year, she married Gezahegne Abera, the 2000 Olympic marathon champion. Alemu returned to the Boston course in both 2004 and 2005, finishing as the runner-up on each occasion. She set a course record of 1:12:57 in her 2005 victory at the San Blas Half Marathon in Puerto Rico.

She was eleventh at the 2009 Chicago Marathon and took a break from competition in the 2010 season. She formed part of an Ethiopian sweep of the 2011 Mumbai Marathon with Koren Yal and Merima Mohammed, placing third in a time of 2:29:04 hours.

Achievements

Personal bests
5000 metres - 15:59.99 min (2000)
Half marathon - 1:09:46 hrs (2000)
Marathon - 2:24:29 hrs (2001)

References

External links

1975 births
Living people
Ethiopian female long-distance runners
Athletes (track and field) at the 2000 Summer Olympics
Athletes (track and field) at the 2004 Summer Olympics
Olympic athletes of Ethiopia
Sportspeople from Oromia Region
African Games bronze medalists for Ethiopia
African Games medalists in athletics (track and field)
Athletes (track and field) at the 1995 All-Africa Games